Menegazzia wilsonii is a species of lichen found in South America. It was first described to science as Anzia wilsonii by Veli Johannes Paavo Bartholomeus Räsänen in 1944, transferred to the genus Pannoparmelia in 1978, and finally transferred to Menegazzia in 2005.

See also
List of Menegazzia species

References

wilsonii
Lichen species
Lichens of South America
Lichens described in 1944
Taxa named by Veli Räsänen